Oligoryzomys fornesi, also known as Fornes' colilargo, is a species of rodent in the genus Oligoryzomys of family Cricetidae. It is found from northeastern Brazil via Paraguay into northeastern Argentina. Its karyotype has 2n = 62 and FNa = 64.

References

Literature cited

Weksler, M., Bonvicino, C., D'Elia, G. and Pardinas, U. 2008. . In IUCN. IUCN Red List of Threatened Species. Version 2009.2. <www.iucnredlist.org>. Downloaded on November 27, 2009.

Oligoryzomys
Mammals described in 1973